Galium nuttallii is a species of flowering plant in the coffee family known by the common names San Diego bedstraw and climbing bedstraw. It is native to the coast and coastal Peninsular and  western Transverse Ranges of southern California and Baja California, where it is a member of chaparral and pine woodland plant communities. It is also found on the Channel Islands and on the mainland as far north as Santa Barbara County

Description
Galium nuttallii is a climbing perennial herb producing a woody base and sprawling with thin, hanging green to red branches up to 1.5 meters long. The stems have whorls of four tiny sharp-pointed leaves at intervals, each leaf under a centimeter long. The plant is dioecious, with male and female individuals bearing different flower types. Both flowers are reddish, and the female flower ovary turns into a berry.

Subspecies
Two subspecies are recognized as of May 2014:

Galium nuttallii subsp. insulare Ferris - southern Channel Islands of California
Galium nuttallii subsp. nuttallii - mainland California and Baja California

See also
California chaparral and woodlands 
California coastal sage and chaparral ecoregion  	
California montane chaparral and woodlands

References

External links
Jepson Manual Treatment — Galium nuttallii
USDA Plants Profile; Galium nuttallii
Galium nuttallii — CalPhoto gallery
Santa Monica Mountains National Recreation Area: Climbing bedstraw
University of California at Irvine, climbing bedstraw (in Orange Co and Los Angeles Co)
Wildflowers in Santa Barbara, Galium nuttallii
Gardening Europe
Cavalera Preserve: native plants — in coastal North San Diego County.

nuttallii
Flora of California
Flora of Baja California
Natural history of the California chaparral and woodlands
Natural history of the Channel Islands of California
Natural history of the Peninsular Ranges
Natural history of the Santa Monica Mountains
Natural history of the Transverse Ranges
Plants described in 1841
Dioecious plants
Flora without expected TNC conservation status